Roussent is a commune in the Pas-de-Calais department in the Hauts-de-France region of France.

Geography
Roussent is located 6 miles (9 km) south of Montreuil-sur-Mer on the D119 road, in the valley of the Authie river, the border with the Somme department.

Population

Places of interest
 The church of St. Riquier, dating from the nineteenth century.
 Traces of an ancient windmill.

See also
 Communes of the Pas-de-Calais department

References

Communes of Pas-de-Calais